Heteroperipatus clarki is a species of velvet worm in the Peripatidae family. Females of this species have 26 to 29 pairs of legs. The original description of this species is based on a female specimen measuring 100 mm in length. The type locality is in Panama.

References

Onychophoran species
Onychophorans of tropical America
Animals described in 1943